Blue Christmas may refer to:

Blue Christmas (holiday), a Christian observance in the latter part of the Advent season
"Blue Christmas" (song), a Christmas song written by  Billy Hayes and Jay W. Johnson and famously performed by Elvis Presley
Blue Christmas (film), a 1978 Japanese science fiction film
"Blue Christmas", an episode of the TV series NCIS: New Orleans
Blue Christmas (Ricky Van Shelton album)
Blue Christmas (Elvis Presley album), 1992
Blue Christmas (Ernest Tubb album), 1964
Blue Christmas (Jimmy Barnes album), 2022
"Blue Xmas (To Whom It May Concern)", a song by Miles Davis on the album Jingle Bell Jazz